The 2021 Georgia Southern Eagles softball team represented Georgia Southern University during the 2021 NCAA Division I softball season. The Eagles played their home games at Eagle Field at GS Softball Complex. The Eagles were led by third-year head coach Kim Dean and were members of the Sun Belt Conference.

Preseason

Sun Belt Conference Coaches Poll
The Sun Belt Conference Coaches Poll was released on February 8, 2021. Georgia Southern was picked to finish seventh in the Sun Belt Conference with 38 votes.

Preseason All-Sun Belt team
Summer Ellyson (LA, SR, Pitcher)
Leanna Johnson (TROY, SO, Pitcher)
Allisa Dalton (LA, SR, Shortstop/3rd Base)
Katie Webb (TROY, SR, Infielder/1st Base)
Raina O'Neal (LA, JR, Outfielder)
Julie Raws (LA, SR, Catcher)
Courtney Dean (CCU, SR, Outfielder)
Mekhia Freeman (GASO, SR, Outfielder)
Korie Kreps (ULM, JR, Outfielder)
Kaitlyn Alderink (LA, SR, 2nd Base)
Jade Gortarez (LA, SR, Shortstop/3rd Base)
Ciara Bryan (LA, SR, Outfielder)
Kelly Horne (TROY, SO, Infielder/2nd Base)
Makiya Thomas (CCU, SR, Outfielder/Infielder)
Tara Oltmann (TXST, SR, Infielder/Shortstop)
Jayden Mount (ULM, SR, Infielder)
Katie Lively (TROY, SO, Outfielder)

National Softball Signing Day

Roster

Coaching staff

Schedule and results

Schedule Source:
*Rankings are based on the team's current ranking in the NFCA/USA Softball poll.

Posteason

Conference Accolades 
Player of the Year: Ciara Bryan – LA
Pitcher of the Year: Summer Ellyson – LA
Freshman of the Year: Sara Vanderford – TXST
Newcomer of the Year: Ciara Bryan – LA
Coach of the Year: Gerry Glasco – LA

All Conference First Team
Ciara Bryan (LA)
Summer Ellyson (LA)
Sara Vanderford (TXST)
Leanna Johnson (TROY)
Jessica Mullins (TXST)
Olivia Lackie (USA)
Kj Murphy (UTA)
Katie Webb (TROY)
Jayden Mount (ULM)
Kandra Lamb (LA)
Kendall Talley (LA)
Meredith Keel (USA)
Tara Oltmann (TXST)
Jade Sinness (TROY)
Katie Lively (TROY)

All Conference Second Team
Kelly Horne (TROY)
Meagan King (TXST)
Mackenzie Brasher (USA)
Bailee Wilson (GASO)
Makiya Thomas (CCU)
Kaitlyn Alderink (LA)
Abby Krzywiecki (USA)
Kenzie Longanecker (APP)
Alissa Dalton (LA)
Julie Rawls (LA)
Korie Kreps (ULM)
Kayla Rosado (CCU)
Justice Milz (LA)
Gabby Buruato (APP)
Arieann Bell (TXST)

References:

References

Georgia Southern
Georgia Southern Eagles softball
Georgia Southern Eagles softball seasons